The Girl from the Naked Eye is a 2012 neo-noir martial arts film directed and written by David Ren. It stars Jason Yee, Samantha Streets, Ron Yuan, Dominique Swain, Sasha Grey and others.

Plot
Jake (Jason Yee) is a hired driver for a seedy escort service operating out of "The Naked Eye" Strip Club, and falls for a witty high-class escort named Sandy (Samantha Streets). However, one night Sandy is found dead, with the only clues remaining being records of cell phone calls made the night she was murdered. Jake sets out to avenge Sandy's death by risking everything and walking a bloody path to find her killer.

Cast
Jason Yee as Jake
Samantha Streets as Sandy
Ron Yuan as Simon
Dominique Swain as Alissa
Gary Stretch as Frank
Jerry C. Ying as Johnny
Sasha Grey as Lena
Wilson Jermaine Heredia as Bobby

Reception

, The Girl from the Naked Eye holds a 40% approval rating on review aggregator Rotten Tomatoes, based on 15 reviews with an average rating of 5.45/10. On Metacritic, the film has a weighted average score of 40 out of 100, based on 7 critics, indicating "mixed or average reviews".

Mark Holcomb of The Village Voice gave the film a negative review, writing, "Ren is at least savvy enough to make Naked Eye'''s pulp inspirations plain... But there are dozens of better, riskier, more interesting films that go unreleased every year—why this militantly dull effort is taking their place is its only worthwhile mystery." Alison Willmore of The A.V. Club stated that the film's cultural twist was interesting, but ultimately called the film a derivative of Miller's Sin City''.

Awards

References

External links
 
 
 

2012 films
2012 action films
2012 independent films
American independent films
American neo-noir films
Films about Chinese Americans
2010s English-language films
2010s American films